Robert D. Drain (born ) is a United States bankruptcy judge of the United States Bankruptcy Court for the Southern District of New York who has presided at several high-profile corporate bankruptcies.

Early life
Drain received a B.A. degree cum laude with honors in 1979 from Yale University and J.D. in 1984 from Columbia University School of Law where he was a Harlan Fiske Stone Scholar for three years.

He was a partner in the bankruptcy department of the New York firm Paul, Weiss, Rifkind, Wharton & Garrison when he was appointed to be judge in 2002.  He was also an adjunct professor of law at St. John's University School of Law's LLM in Bankruptcy Program for several years and is an adjunct professor at the Pace University School of Law.

Notable cases
He has presided over the bankruptcies of:

A&P
Cenveo
Christian Brothers
Coudert Brothers
Delphi Automotive
Frontier Airlines
Frontier Communications
Hostess Brands
Loral
OneWeb
Purdue Pharma
RCN
Reader's Digest
Refco
Roust
Sears Holdings Corporation
Star Tribune
Sungard
Tops
Windstream Holdings

In addition he has presided over the ancillary or plenary cases involving foreign companies with United States connections, including Parmalat, Varig S.A., and Yukos.

References

1957 births
Yale University alumni
Columbia Law School alumni
St. John's University (New York City) faculty
Judges of the United States bankruptcy courts
Living people